The following events occurred in June 1971:

June 1, 1971 (Tuesday)
Vietnam Veterans for a Just Peace, an organization claiming to represent the majority of U.S. Vietnam War veterans who served in Southeast Asia, sponsored an event to speak against war protests.
 The East Pakistan Razakar Ordinance, promulgated by Pakistan Army General Tikka Khan, made the Razakars, a paramilitary organization that has carried out massacres of Bengali civilians in East Pakistan, recognized members of the Pakistan Army.
 Died: Reinhold Niebuhr, 78, American theologian and political commentator

June 2, 1971 (Wednesday)

Sergey Mikhailovich Izvekov was elected by bishops of the Russian Orthodox Church to be the new Patriarch of Moscow, leader of the Church, and took the name Pimen.  As Pimen the First, he was enthroned the next day.
Ajax Amsterdam of the Netherlands defeated Panathinaikos FC of Athens in Greece, 2 to 0, to win soccer football's European Cup Final, held at Wembley Stadium in England before a crowd of 83,179.
The first issue of the daily newspaper Al Ra'i (literally The Opinion), owned by the government of Jordan, was published, in Amman. 
 Born: Rustam Sharipov, Ukrainian gymnast; in Dushanbe, Tajik SSR, Soviet Union

June 3, 1971 (Thursday)
Jimmy Hoffa, president of the International Brotherhood of Teamsters, announced from prison that he would not be running for re-election for president of the labor union.  Hoffa had been incarcerated at the federal penitentiary in Lewisburg, Pennsylvania for the past four years for pension fraud and attempted jury fixing.

Lew Alcindor, winner in 1970 of the NBA's Most Valuable Player award, announced that he had changed his name to Kareem Abdul-Jabbar.
 In the second of two games of the 1971 Inter-Cities Fairs Cup Final, held in Leeds, Leeds United F.C. played to a 1-1 draw with Juventus F.C., after a 2-2 tie at Turin. Leeds was awarded the win based on a tiebreaker, based on "away goals" (having had 2 goals in Italy compared to one goal by Juventus in Leeds.
 The comedy No Sex Please, We're British, opened at the Strand Theatre, beginning a 16-year run that would make it the eighth longest-running stage production in London's West End.
Born: Luigi Di Biagio, Italian footballer and caretaker for the Italian National Team from 2018 to 2020; in Rome
Died: Gertrud Natzler, 63, Austrian-American artist who popularized ceramics art

June 4, 1971 (Friday)
 Kosmos 426 was launched by the Soviet Union as part of the Dnepropetrovsk Sputnik programme, for the purpose of studying charged particles and radiation in the Earth's magnetosphere.  It operates for six months, but remains in orbit until 2002.
United Airlines Flight 796, a Boeing 737-200 with 72 people on board, in a flight from Charleston, West Virginia, to Newark, New Jersey, United States, was hijacked by a drunk passenger, Glen Elmo Riggs, who demanded to be flown to Israel. The plane diverted to Washington Dulles International Airport in Virginia, where Riggs was overpowered.
 Born: Joseph Kabila, former President of the Democratic Republic of the Congo, in Rwanda

June 5, 1971 (Saturday)
The Six Flags Over Mid-America theme park was opened in St. Louis, Missouri.
West Germany's premier soccer football league, the Bundesliga, completed its regular season, with Borussia Mönchengladbach (with 20 wins and 10 draws) finishing in first place ahead of Bayern Munich (19 wins and 10 draws), after Munich lost, 0 to 2, to MSV Duisburg and Mönchengladbach defeated Eintracht Frankfurt, 4 to 1.
Born: Mark Wahlberg, American film actor and producer, and former rap artist who had founded Marky Mark and the Funky Bunch; in Boston.
Died: André Trocmé, 70, French pacifist pastor and war hero

June 6, 1971 (Sunday)
Soyuz 11, with cosmonauts Vladislav Volkov, Georgi Dobrovolski and Viktor Patsayev, was launched from Baikonur Cosmodrome at 10:55 in the morning local time (0455 UTC) for rendezvous with the Salyut-1 space station.
All 44 passengers and five crew members aboard Hughes Airwest Flight 706 were killed when the Douglas DC-9 jetliner collided with a U.S. Marine Corps F-4B Phantom jet fighter in the skies over Duarte, California. After the mid-air collision, the DC-9, crashed into a remote canyon in the San Gabriel Mountains near Mount Bliss, approximately three miles north of Duarte.  One of the two crew survived the crash of the F-4B in another canyon.
A special train from Moorgate to Neasden depot, comprising No. L94 (ex-GWR 5700 Class No. 7752) and a selection of maintenance rolling stock, was run by London Transport to mark the end of its time operating steam locomotives.
 Died: Sergei Denisov, 61, Soviet fighter pilot and twice awarded holder of the Hero of the Soviet Union medal

June 7, 1971 (Monday)
Philippine government official Manuel Elizalde, the head of the PANAMIN Foundation (Presidential Assistant on National Minorities), reported that he had discovered the Tasaday people, purported to be an isolated tribe, described as living in the "Stone Age", on the island of Mindanao, in the rain forest near Lake Sebu.
 Died: Garfield Wood, 90, American inventor

June 20, 1971 (Sunday)
 Jacky Ickx of Belgium won the 1971 Dutch Grand Prix auto race at Zandvoort, held in a pouring rain and on a slick race track, finishing four seconds ahead of Pedro Rodríguez of Mexico
 The Coupe de France, trophy for the highest-level professional soccer football tournament in France, was won by Stade Rennais, 1 to 0, over Olympique Lyonnais at the Olympic Stadium in Colombes before a crowd of 46,801.
The second of the NBA-ABA All-Star games took place in Indianapolis in a format where the West All-Stars and the East All-Stars were composed of players from both leagues.  The West All-Stars, which included George McGinnis of the ABA Indiana Pacers and Earl "the Pearl" Monroe of the NBA New York Knicks, defeated the East All-Stars, 111 to 100.
In western Turkey, near Afyonkarahisar, 33 people were killed and 24 injured in the collision of a bus and a truck.
 Died: 
Frances Roth, 75, American lawyer who founded the New Haven Restaurant Institute, now called The Culinary Institute of America
Joseph Pearson, 90, British-born Australian zoologist namesake of Pearson's long-clawed shrew (Solisorex pearsoni)

June 21, 1971 (Monday)
 The International Court of Justice, commonly known as "The World Court", ruled 13 to 2 in an advisory that South Africa's occupation of the trust territory of South-West Africa (now Namibia) was illegal and that its administration of the territory should halt at once.  The British and French judges were opposed the ruling, and South Africa's government refused to abide by the World Court's judgment.  South African Prime Minister John Vorster called the decision "an international political vendetta" and said that South Africa was administering South-West Africa "with a view to self-determination for all population groups".
 Golfer Lee Trevino won the U.S. Open in an 18-hole playoff against Jack Nicklaus, after both players had identical scores of 280 the day before.  Trevino had 68 and Nicklaus 71 in the 3-stroke win.
 Britain began new negotiations in Luxembourg, led by Geoffrey Rippon, for EEC membership.  By the morning of June 23, more than 40 hours of talks resulted in the United Kingdom's entry into the Common Market.

June 22, 1971 (Tuesday)
For the first time since the Vietnam War began, the U.S. Senate voted for a pullout of all troops, but only on the condition that North Vietnam and the Viet Cong release American prisoners of war.  The vote, an amendment to the authorization of an extension of the draft, passed, 57 to 42, and was sent to the House of Representatives.  The House rejected the amendment six days later by a vote of 176 for and 219 against.
 Born: 
Kurt Warner, American football quarterback, who went from being a bagger in an Iowa supermarket to becoming the NFL's Most Valuable Player; in Burlington, Iowa
Laila Rouass, British actress, in London

June 23, 1971 (Wednesday)
"Inhibition of Prostaglandin Synthesis as a Mechanism of Action for Aspirin-like Drugs", a paper by University of London pharmacologist John R. Vane, was published in the scientific journal Nature New Biology, providing his findings that would later earn him the Nobel Prize in Physiology or Medicine, that aspirin and similar pain relievers work by inhibiting the release of prostaglandin.
After a marathon negotiating session that lasted until 5:00 in the morning in Luxembourg, representatives of the European Economic Community (EEC) and the United Kingdom came to an agreement on terms for the UK to enter the Community and to join the Common Market.  Among the points of dispute resolved, the two sides agreed that the UK's payment to the EEC for its first year would be 100 million British pounds (equivalent at the time to USD $240,000,000, to be trebled by 1978.
In "a stock offering that made Wall Street history... because it no doubt will establish a precedent for public ownership of many of the other Wall Street houses, Merrill Lynch became the second Wall Street stockbroking firm to go public.  The initial price a share of Merrill Lynch common stock was $28.00 as part of raising $112,000,000 through sales.
The government of Poland turned over ownership of 6,900 former German church buildings and parsonages to the Roman Catholic Church, in a new law that provided for the transfer in those archdioceses in territory acquired from Germany at the end of World War II. The transfer, dated retroactively to the beginning of the 1971, fulfilled a promise made by Polish United Workers Party Chairman Edward Gierek as part of ending the December riots.  Many of the churches that became Catholic houses of worship had formerly been used by German Lutherans.

June 24, 1971 (Thursday)
 Seventeen construction workers were killed by a natural gas explosion while drilling a tunnel beneath Sylmar, California.
 The Kosmos 428 military reconnaissance satellite was launched by the Soviet Union.
 Born: Ursula Meier, French-born Swiss film director; in Besançon

June 25, 1971 (Friday)
 The Death of Actaeon, a 16th century masterpiece painting by the Italian Renaissance painter Titian (Tiziano Vecelli) was purchased at an auction in London for  £1.6 million  (the equivalent of $4,032,000) by an American art dealer, Julius Weitzner.  At the time, the amount paid at the auction by Christie's was the second highest ever for a painting, but much less than the three million pounds that had been forecast within the London art community.
Born: Angela Kinsey, American actress, in Lafayette, Louisiana
 Died: John Boyd Orr, 90, Scottish physician and biologist, recipient of the Nobel Prize in Physiology or Medicine

June 26, 1971 (Saturday)
After Petit climbed down, Paris police took him to a nearby precinct headquarters for a check of his identity, then accompanied him to make sure that he dismantled his high-wire equipment, and released him without filing charges.
 Died: Johannes Frießner, 79, German World War II general

June 27, 1971 (Sunday)
 Elections were held in Japan for 126 of the 252 seats of the House of Councillors, the upper house of the Japanese parliament.   Although the Liberal Democratic Party (LDP) maintained its control of the Councillors, losing only three seats, the Japan Socialist party made some gains, taking 28 of the "constituency" seats for district representatives, and 39 of the at-large national seats.
 U.S. concert promoter Bill Graham closed the legendary Fillmore East venue, which had first opened on 2nd Avenue in New York City in 1968.
 Born: Dipendra Bir Birkam, Crown Prince of Nepal; in Kathmandu (committed suicide, 2001)

June 28, 1971 (Monday)

 Reputed Brooklyn Mafia chief Joseph Colombo was shot in the head during the Italian-American Civil Rights League "Unity Day" rally at Columbus Circle in New York City, despite protection by police and his own bodyguards.  His assailant, Jerome A. Johnson, had gotten within close range of Colombo while wearing a press pass that he had picked up from IACRL officials. At 11:45 in the morning, Colombo was asked to pose for a photo with a bystander, and was shot twice by Johnson.  Moments later, Johnson was shot to death, apparently by one of Colombo's bodyguards.  Colombo survived after five hours of surgery, but suffered brain damage and would be paralyzed for the rest of his life. 
By a vote of 8 to 0, the U.S. Supreme Court unanimously reversed the conviction of heavyweight boxer Muhammad Ali, four years after he had been found guilty of refusing induction into the U.S. Army, and after Ali's world championships had been revoked by boxing commissions." The Court concluded that Ali had been improperly drafted despite his claim to be a conscientious objector to military service based on his religious faith as a Muslim.
Born: Elon Musk, South African-Canadian-American technology entrepreneur, founder of SpaceX and CEO of Tesla, in Johannesburg, South Africa
 Died: Camille Clifford, 85, Belgian actress and model

June 29, 1971 (Tuesday)
 U. S. Senator Mike Gravel attempted to read the Pentagon Papers into the Congressional Record, but was unable to do so because a quorum of at least 51 U.S. Senators was not available and the session was forced to adjourn. As an alternative, Senator Gravel went to a hearing room in the new Senate Office Building.  In his capacity as Chairman of the U.S. Senate Subcommittee on Public Buildings and Grounds, Gravel found a quorum of members and then began reading the documents for three hours before adjourning.

June 30, 1971 (Wednesday)
 After a successful mission aboard Salyut 1, the world's first manned space station, the crew of the Soyuz 11 spacecraft were killed during their return to Earth after 24 days on the orbiting station. When the recovery team reached the capsule after its landing, they opened the hatch and found the bodies of all three cosmonauts — Colonel Georgi T. Dobrovolsky and engineers Vladislav N. Volkov and Viktor I. Patsayev. An investigation later determined that a faulty valve within the Soyuz capsule had caused the oxygen within the capsule to slowly leak out as the craft was descending to Earth. More than two years after the accident, the Soviet Union provided full details to the U.S. in advance of the 1975 Apollo-Soyuz mission. The shock of firing 12 explosive bolts to separate the re-entry capsule from the orbiter had forced the exhaust valve open and had loosened a valve cap that had acted as a safety device. While the cosmonauts realized that the valve was emptying the cabin's oxygen into space, they were cabin pressure fell within 10 seconds while they were trying to assess the problem, and the capsule was completely empty of air 45 seconds after they were unconscious. 
 In New York Times Co. v. United States, the U.S. Supreme Court ruled, 6 to 3, that the Pentagon Papers could be published, rejecting government injunctions as unconstitutional prior restraint. The Times resumed publication of the documents the next day.
 The U.S. State of Ohio approved ratification of the 26th Amendment to the United States Constitution by a vote of 81 to 9 in the state house of representatives, one day after the state senate had voted 30 to 2 in favor of approval.  In so doing, Ohio became the 38th of the 50 U.S. states to ratify the amendment to lower the minimum voting age nationwide from 21 years old to 18 years old, providing the necessary three-quarters majority necessary for the 26th Amendment to become law.
 Died: Nikola Kotkov, 32, and Georgi Asparuhov, (28), Bulgarian footballers, were killed in a car accident

References

1971
1971-06
1971-06